Granila is a Neotropical genus of firetips in the family Hesperiidae.

Granila is a monotypic genus containing only Granila paseas.

References
Natural History Museum Lepidoptera genus database

Hesperiidae
Hesperiidae of South America
Monotypic butterfly genera
Hesperiidae genera